Kantibhai Gamit is an Indian politician. He was elected to the Gujarat Legislative Assembly from Nizar in the 2012 Gujarat Legislative Assembly election as a member of the Bharatiya Janata Party. He was sworn as Minister of State for Tribal Development in Anandiben Patel cabinet in 2014.

References

Living people
State cabinet ministers of Gujarat
People from Tapi district
1952 births
Gujarat MLAs 2012–2017
Bharatiya Janata Party politicians from Gujarat